Anorectal disorders include conditions involving the anorectal junction as seen in the image. They are painful but common conditions like hemorrhoids, tears, fistulas, or abscesses that affect the anal region. Most people experience some form of anorectal disorder during their lifetime. Primary care physicians can treat most of these disorders, however, high-risk individuals include those with HIV, roughly half of whom need surgery to remedy the disorders. Likelihood of malignancy should also be considered in high risk individuals. This is why it is important to perform a full history and physical exam on each patient. Because these disorders affect the rectum, people are often embarrassed or afraid to confer with a medical professional.

Common Conditions.

Symptoms and signs 
Itchiness, a burning sensation, pus discharge, blood, and swelling in around the rectum and anus, diarrhea. Other common symptoms include anal spasm, Bleeding with defecation and painful defecation.

Diagnosis 
Doctors uses a variety of tools and techniques to evaluate the type of anorectal disorder, including digital and anoscopic investigations, palpations, and palpitations. The initial examination can be painful because a gastroenterologist will need to spread the buttocks and probe the painful area, which may require a local anesthetic.

Treatment
Treatments range from recommendations for over-the-counter products to more invasive surgical procedures.

Among the most common outpatient advice given to patients with less severe disorders include a high-fiber diet, application of ointment, and increased water intake. More serious procedures include the removal of affected tissue, injection of botulinum toxin, or surgically opening the fistula tract in the sphincter muscle.

Notes

Gastrointestinal tract disorders